The 2020–21 English football winter transfer window runs from 7 October 2020 to 2 February 2021 due to the effects of the coronavirus pandemic on the football calendar. The domestic transfer window for the Football League was extended until 16 October. Players without a club may be signed at any time, clubs may sign players on loan dependent on their league's regulations, and clubs may sign a goalkeeper on an emergency loan if they have no registered senior goalkeeper available. This list includes transfers featuring at least one club from either the Premier League or the EFL that were completed after the end of the summer 2020 transfer window on 6 October and before the end of the 2020–21 winter window.

Transfers
All players and clubs without a flag are English. Note that while Cardiff City, Swansea City and Newport County are affiliated with the Football Association of Wales and thus take the Welsh flag, they play in the Championship and League Two respectively, and so their transfers are included here.

Loans

References

2020–21 in English football
England
Winter 2020-21